SPMI may refer to:

 Saint Petersburg Mining Institute
 Serious Persistent Mental Illness
 Socialist Party of Michigan, a political party
 System Power Management Interface, in mobile technology